Jeffrey Dee Wright (born June 13, 1963) is a former  American football nose tackle who had a seven-year career in the National Football League with the Buffalo Bills. He became the Bills starting nose tackle in his third season. He played in four Super Bowls for the Bills, all losing efforts.  Wright played college football first at Coffeyville Community College in Kansas, and then at Central Missouri State University, now known as the University of Central Missouri.

References

External links
NFL.com player page

1963 births
Living people
Sportspeople from San Bernardino, California
Players of American football from California
American football defensive tackles
Coffeyville Red Ravens football players
Central Missouri Mules football players
Buffalo Bills players